Horace Sprague Judson (June 10, 1863 – November 22, 1926) was an American glove manufacturer and politician from New York.

Life 
Horace was born on June 10, 1863 in Kingsboro, a neighborhood in Gloversville, Fulton County, New York. His parents were Daniel Brown Judson, a prominent glove manufacturer, and Phoebe E. Brown. His brother was John B. Judson.

He attended, Williston Seminary, Union Classical Institute, and Union College. He graduated from Union College in 1886, and was a member of the Delta Phi fraternity's Alpha chapter.

After graduating, Horace returned to Gloversville, where he worked as a glove manufacturer. He was president of the local Eureka Club. Between 1890 and 1892, he served as an alderman for Gloversville.

In 1891, Horace was elected to the New York State Assembly as a Democrat, representing Fulton and Hamilton counties. He served in the Assembly in 1892.

Horace was married twice, first to Jessie Belden and then to Mabel Marstellar.

Horace died on November 22, 1926 in Gloversville. He was buried in Prospect Hill Cemetery in Gloversville.

References

External links 
 The Political Graveyard
 Horace S. Judson at Find a Grave

1863 births
1926 deaths
People from Gloversville, New York
Williston Northampton School alumni
Union College (New York) alumni
New York (state) local politicians
Democratic Party members of the New York State Assembly
19th-century American politicians
Burials in New York (state)